Pretty Huge (stylized as Pretty HUGE) is a multi-sports and performance training facility at the SM Aura Premier, Bonifacio Global City in Taguig, Metro Manila, Philippines. Originally established as a multi-level obstacle course racing, the facility was expanded to include a FIBA-grade indoor basketball court that may be used for other indoor sports and an elevated 100m race track.

History
While already being used in 2018, the facility was officially launched on February 1, 2019 and opened to the general public on March 1, 2019. Pretty Huge Obstacles temporarily closed and underwent renovation during the COVID-19 pandemic, and officially reopened its doors to the general public on June 1, 2022, with its rebranded name, 'Pretty Huge'.

Facilities 

 A full-size basketball court with FIBA grade indoor basketball court
 An elevated indoor running track
 A boxing area with full equipment
 A youth and adult obstacle course that is POSF certified and recognized by the Philippine Olympic Committee
 A fitness facility with state-of-the-art equipment using Technogym equipment and the latest SkillX program
 A members lounge exclusive to VIP members
 A physio and massage clinic with licensed physical therapists for relaxation, flexibility and reducing injuries

Sports 
Seasonal sports leagues and tournaments for basketball, dodgeball, and many more are open to aspiring players, as well as team-building activities, training camps, youth programs, and group classes for everyone to enjoy.

References

Sports venues in Metro Manila
Sports venues completed in 2019